Joseph Alphonse Conrad Bourcier (May 28, 1916 – October 5, 1987) was a Canadian professional ice hockey centre. He was born in Montreal, Quebec.

Playing career 
Bourcier played for the Pittsburgh Shamrocks of the International Hockey League, the Montreal Canadiens during the 1935–36 NHL season, as well as a single game with the Cornwall Cookies of the Quebec Provincial Hockey League. His brother Jean also played for Montreal and Pittsburgh throughout the same seasons.

Career statistics

References

External links 

1916 births
1987 deaths
Canadian ice hockey centres
Ice hockey people from Montreal
Montreal Canadiens players
Pittsburgh Shamrocks players
Canadian expatriates in the United States